The Boujdour lighthouse (or Cabo Bojador Light;) is a lighthouse located near Cape Bojador in the city of Boujdour in the Laâyoune-Sakia El Hamra region of Morocco. The Boujdour lighthouse became a historical monument in the southern provinces of Morocco after the annexation of Western Sahara to Morocco in 1976.

History
The present structure replaced a 1903 square tower on the fort of Boujdour. It was built while Western Sahara was a Spanish colony. Work began in 1953 and the lighthouse was commissioned in 1959. Morocco took control of the territory in 1975 and created Boujdour Province in 1976. The legal status is still disputed.

Structure
The structure contains a particularly hard stone, similar to granite. It is a white conical concrete tower, with beige vertical stripes. It has a spiral staircase with 246 steps. The equipment has been modernized.

The lighthouse is considered a historical monument. It is managed by the Port and Maritime Authority within the Ministry of Equipment, Transport and Logistics.

Notes

Citations

Sources

 

Lighthouses in Morocco